Benjamin Banneker High School can refer to schools in the United States:
Benjamin Banneker High School (Georgia) in unincorporated Fulton County, Georgia
Benjamin Banneker Academic High School in Washington, DC